Kadell Thomas (born November 26, 1996) is a Canadian professional soccer player who plays for Sigma FC in League1 Ontario.

Early life
A native of Brampton, Ontario, Thomas began playing soccer with Brampton Youth SC before later joining Brampton East SC. At age 15, he joined the Sigma FC youth program.

College career
In 2014, Thomas attended Cloud County Community College, playing for the men's soccer team, where he recorded two goals and five assists in 19 appearances.

In 2016, he attended Broward College, recording eight goals and four assists in six appearances, earning second team all-star honours.

In 2017, he was set to transfer to California State University, Fullerton to play for the Cal State Fullerton Titans, but did not eventually join.

In 2022, he began attending Humber College, where he will play for the men's soccer team.

Club career
He made his senior debut with Sigma FC in League1 Ontario in 2014. In 2017, Thomas scored a career-high seventeen goals in eighteen appearances, tied for second among league top scorers, and was subsequently named to the league First All-Star Team. In 2018, Thomas made fourteen league appearances, scoring four goals and added another four goals in three playoff appearances. He was subsequently named to the league First All-Star Team for the second year in a row.

On March 2, 2019, Thomas signed his first professional contract with Canadian Premier League side Forge FC, joining former coach Bobby Smyrniotis. On April 27, 2019, Thomas made his professional debut as a substitute in the inaugural match of the Canadian Premier League and scored the first goal in Forge FC history in the 78th minute. Later in 2019, he suffered a head injury during a collision, requiring oral surgery, which caused him to miss much of the remainder of the season, returning in the league final.

In 2021, he returned to Sigma FC.

Career statistics

Honours

Club
Forge FC
Canadian Premier League: 2019, 2020

Individual
League1 Ontario First Team All-Star: 2017, 2018

References

External links

1996 births
Living people
Association football forwards
Canadian soccer players
Sportspeople from North York
Soccer players from Toronto
Black Canadian soccer players
Canadian expatriate soccer players
Expatriate soccer players in the United States
Canadian expatriate sportspeople in the United States
Broward College alumni
Humber College alumni
Forge FC players
League1 Ontario players
Canadian Premier League players
Sigma FC players
Cloud County Thunderbirds men's soccer players
Broward Seahawks men's soccer players